Otira is a genus of South Pacific tangled nest spiders first described by Raymond Robert Forster & C. L. Wilton in 1973.

Species
 it contains six species:
Otira canasta Forster & Wilton, 1973 — New Zealand
Otira indura Forster & Wilton, 1973 — New Zealand
Otira liana Forster & Wilton, 1973 — New Zealand
Otira parva Forster & Wilton, 1973 — New Zealand
Otira satura Forster & Wilton, 1973 — New Zealand
Otira terricola Forster & Wilton, 1973 — New Zealand

References

Amaurobiidae
Araneomorphae genera
Taxa named by Raymond Robert Forster